See You in Montevideo (/Montevideo, vidimo se!) is a 2014 Serbian comedy film written and directed by Dragan Bjelogrlić. It is the sequel to the 2010 film Montevideo, God Bless You! It was selected as the Serbian entry for the Best Foreign Language Film at the 87th Academy Awards, but was not nominated. See You in Montevideo was shot over a number of locations, Paraćin, Belgrade, Ulcinj, Trieste, and also the Spanish Island of Tenerife.

Plot
The Yugoslav national football team prepares to participate in the inaugural FIFA World Cup, the world championship for men's national association football teams that will take place in the capital of Uruguay, Montevideo in 1930. After a lengthy trip over the Atlantic Ocean, the Yugoslav national team finds themselves amongst 12 other nations, competing for the World Cup.

The Yugoslav team are the underdogs of the tournament and are given a minimal chance of succeeding after being drawn with the favorites of the tournament, Brazil. Thanks to the talent and dedication of the players, they defeat Bolivia and Brazil in their group stage and advanced to the knockout stage. News spreads around the world that Yugoslavia came third place in the tournament and received a bronze medal.

Cast

 Miloš Biković as Aleksandar "Tirke" Tirnanić
 Petar Strugar as Blagoje "Moša" Marjanović
 Viktor Savić as Milutin "Milutinac" Ivković
 Armand Assante as Hotchkins
 Elena Martínez as Dolores
 Branko Đurić as Paco
 Srđan Todorović as Bora Jovanović
 Predrag Vasić as Little Stanoje
 Nebojša Ilić as Boško "Dunster" Simonović
 Vojin Ćetković as Mihailo Andrejević
 Srđan Timarov as Kosta Hadži
 Aleksandar Radojčić as Milorad "Balerina" Arsenijević
 Uroš Jovicić as Đorđe "Ðokica Nosonja" Vujadinović
 Bojan Krivokapić as Momčilo "Gusar" Đokić
 Andrija Kuzmanović as Milovan "Jakša" Jakšić
 Ivan Zekić as Ivan "Ivica" Bek
 Nenad Heraković as Dragoslav "Vampir" Mihajlović
 Aleksandar Filimonović as Ljubiša "Leo" Stevanović
 Rade Ćosić as Teofilo Spasojević
 Milan Nikitović as Branislav "Bane" Sekulić
 Bojan Micic as Bertrand "Bert" Patenaude
 Peter J. Chaffey as Thomas "Tom" Florie

See also
 List of submissions to the 87th Academy Awards for Best Foreign Language Film
 List of Serbian submissions for the Academy Award for Best Foreign Language Film

Notes

References

External links
 

2014 films
2010s sports comedy films
2014 comedy films
Films set in 1930
Serbian sports comedy films
2010s Serbian-language films
2010s Spanish-language films
Films about the FIFA World Cup
Films set in Serbia
Films set in Montevideo
History of Serbia on film
Serbian multilingual films
Cultural depictions of Serbian men
2014 multilingual films